Galasa is a genus of snout moths. It was described by Francis Walker in 1866.

Species
 Galasa belliculalis Dyar, 1914
 Galasa concordalis Dyar, 1913
 Galasa costalis Dyar, 1913
 Galasa cuprealis (Hampson, 1906)
 Galasa dilirialis Dyar, 1914
 Galasa dubitalis Dyar, 1914
 Galasa fervidalis Dyar, 1914
 Galasa lophopalis Dyar, 1914
 Galasa lutealis Dyar, 1914
 Galasa major (Warren, 1891)
 Galasa modestalis Dyar, 1913
 Galasa monitoralis Dyar, 1914
 Galasa nigrinodis (Zeller, 1873)
 Galasa nigripunctalis (Barnes & McDunnough, 1913)
 Galasa pallidalis Dyar, 1914
 Galasa relativalis Dyar, 1914
 Galasa rubidana Walker, 1866
 Galasa rugosalis Dyar, 1913
 Galasa strenualis Dyar, 1914
 Galasa stygialis Dyar, 1914
 Galasa subpallidalis Dyar, 1914
 Galasa vulgalis Dyar, 1913

References

Chrysauginae
Pyralidae genera